The 1875 West Suffolk by-election was fought on 4 October 1875.  The byelection was fought due to the death of the incumbent Conservative MP, Fuller Maitland Wilson.  It was won by the unopposed Conservative candidate Thomas Thornhill.

References

1875 elections in the United Kingdom
1875 in England
West
Suffolk
October 1875 events